This articles lists events from the year 2021 in Oman.

Incumbents
Sultan/Prime Minister: Haitham bin Tariq Al Said

Events 
 30 July - A Liberian-flagged tanker ship was struck by a drone attack off the coast of Oman, killing two crew members.

Deaths

References

 
2020s in Oman
Years of the 21st century in Oman
Oman
Oman